The 5th AARP Movies for Grownups Awards, presented by AARP the Magazine, honored films released in 2005 made by people over the age of 50. This was the first year that winners were announced at an in-person ceremony instead of being listed only in an issue of AARP the Magazine. The ceremony was hosted by Angela Lansbury and Shelley Berman at the Bel-Air Hotel in Los Angeles on February 7, 2006. Capote won Best Movie for Grownups, and David Strathairn won the award for Breakaway Accomplishment for Good Night, and Good Luck.

This was the last year that the AARP gave out awards for television (in the Best TV Movie category) until 2020. It was the first year an award was given for Best Comedy for Grownups.

Awards

Winners and nominees

Winners are listed first, highlighted in boldface, and indicated with a double dagger.

Breakaway accomplishment
 David Strathairn: "One of Hollywood's most reliable supporting actors is so good he's scary as Edward R. Murrow."

Runners up
 Pierce Brosnan for The Matador
 Tommy Lee Jones for directing The Three Burials of Melquiades Estrada
 Kate Montgomery for directing Christmas in the Clouds
 Susan Stroman for directing The Producers

Films with multiple nominations

References

AARP Movies for Grownups Awards
AARP